Global Underground 019: John Digweed, Los Angeles is a DJ mix album in the Global Underground series, compiled and mixed by John Digweed. The mix is a retrospective look at a set in Los Angeles, United States during Halloween night.

Track listing

Disc one
 Pole Folder & CP - "Apollo Vibes" – 9:22
 Satoshi Tomiie featuring Kelli Ali - "Love in Traffic" – 7:08
 Madam - "Penetration" – 6:08
 Electric Tease - "Your Lovin'" – 6:38
 Teimoso featuring Shelly Preston - "Riding" – 6:06
 Jamez present Tatoine - "Music" – 4:42
 Bipath - "Paranoize" – 5:30
 Photek - "Mine to Give" – 6:30
 Tijuana - "Groove is in the Air" – 4:15
 Dirty Harry - "Musica" – 7:15
 Brothers Love Dubs - "1-800 Ming" – 10:20

Disc two
 Jimmy Van M @ Sanctuary - "Sanctuary" – 9:27
 White Room - "Strapped" – 4:03
 Medway - "My Release" – 6:15
 DJ Gogo - "Adyssa" – 5:24
 Roland Klinkenberg - "Inner Laugh" – 5:53
 Way Out West - "The Fall" – 8:06
 Quivver - "One Last Time" – 4:45
 Cass - "Genesis" – 6:54
 Breeder - "Carnival XIII" – 6:50
 Aria - "One" – 6:38
 Salt Tank - "The Energy" – 6:44

References

External links 

Global Underground
John Digweed albums
2001 compilation albums
DJ mix albums